Jarasandha is a king featured in Hindu literature. He is the powerful monarch of Magadha, and a minor antagonist in Mahabharata. He is the son of the king Brihadratha, the founder of the Barhadratha dynasty of Magadha. According to popular lore, the descendants of Brihadratha ruled Magadha for 2600 years followed by Pradyota Dynasty and the Haryanka dynasty. He is mentioned in the Mahabharata and the Vayu Purana. He is also mentioned as the ninth pratinarayana in the Jain text Harivamsa Purana.

Etymology
The word Jarasandha has been explained as a combination of two Sanskrit words: jara (जरा) and sandha (सन्ध), "joining" The meaning of Jarasandha is "the one who is joined by Jara".

Legend

Birth and early life 
 
Jarasandha's father, King Brihadratha, was married to the twin daughters of the king of Kashi. Brihadratha loved both his wives equally but had no sons. The sage Chandakaushika visited his kingdom and gave fruit to the king as a boon. The king divided the fruit equally between both of his wives. Soon, both wives became pregnant and gave birth to two halves of a human body. These two lifeless halves were very horrifying to view, so Brihadratha ordered  to be thrown in the forest. An asuri named Jara found the two halves and picked up one with her right hand, one with her left, holding each piece in her palm. When she brought both of her palms together, the two pieces joined, becoming a living child. The child cried loudly, which caused Jara to panic. Not having the heart to eat a living child, Jara took the baby to the king and explained to him all that had happened. The father was overjoyed to see his son.

Conflicts with Balarama and Krishna 
 
Kamsa, the ruler of Mathura, acquired Jarasandha's attention. Impressed with his bravery, Jarasandha made Kamsa his son-in-law by marrying off his two daughters. This makes Jarasandha a relative of Krishna. Krishna killed Kamsa as announced by a divine prophecy. Jarasandha got infuriated as his daughters were widowed. Thereafter, Jarasandha vowed to kill Krishna. Jarasandha attacked Mathura with an army of 23 akshauhinis, but Krishna and Balarama somehow managed the whole army of Jarasandha and his allies. Jarasandha attacked Mathura 17 times and was defeated by Krishna.
 
During the 18th attack, the Yavana king Kalayavana also attacked Mathura with a huge army. Kalyavana had a boon to never die on a battle field, so Krishna challenged him to a duel. While fighting, Krishna lures him into a mountain where the great king Muchukunda lay asleep. Muchukunda had left his kingdom to help the devas in a great war against the asuras, he stayed and protected Svargaloka for 1 year until the asuras were finally defeated. Indra tells Muchukunda to ask a boon as they can grant him anything but Muchukunda says that he doesn't want anything as helping them was his pleasure and that he just wants to return home, Indra sadly replies that though only 1 year has passed in Svarga 360 years have passed on earth and that all of his family had died. Muchukunda was saddened and asked him for eternal sleep, so Indra grants him the boon that anybody who distubs his sleep would turn to ashes. Krishna knew that Machhakunda was sleeping on the mountain but Kalayavana didn't, so when Krishna finds Muchukunda he covers him with a shawl that Krishna was wearing. Kalayavana upon seeing a sleeping man covered with Krishna's shawl thought that Krishna was pretending to sleep in order to escape him, as it's against the rules of war to attack a sleeping man. Kalayavana kicks him to make him stand up which wakes up Muchukunda and from his eyes great flames erupt causing Kalayavana to burn up and as he was not on the battlefield he died without violating his boon. Krishna then grants Muchukunda moksha, or freedom from the cycle of death and rebirth.

Jarasandha keeps attacking Mathura and eventually Krishna orders Vishvakarma, the divine architect, to craft a magnificent city near the sea which is done overnight, then Krishna transports the entire population of Mathura to the new city, which was named Dvaraka. When Jarasandha attacks again he sets the city of Mathura ablaze, Krishna and Balarama merely use their powers to go to Dvaraka unscathed.

Jarasandha thinks that Krishna has died and returns to his own land. But in a short while, when Jarasandha was sitting in Dratharashtras court learns that Krishna has only changed the capital.

Later life and death 

In the Shanti Parva of Mahabharata, Jarasandha fought with Karna after the svayamvara of daughter (Bhanumati) of Chitrangada. After a tough fight, Karna defeated him. To please Karna, Jarasandha gifted him the land of Malini to rule.

He was also a major hurdle before emperor Yudhishthira when the latter decided to perform an offering. As Jarasandha was a powerful warrior, it was necessary for the Pandavas to eliminate him. Krishna, Bhima, and Arjuna disguised as brahmins traveled to Magadha and met Jarasandha. After a formal meeting, Jarasandha enquired about their intentions. Krishna, Bhima, and Arjuna revealed their actual identities. Krishna then challenged Jarasandha for a duel and gave him the freedom to choose any one belligerent. Jarasandha selected Bhima for a duel. Both Bhima and Jarasandha were accomplished wrestlers. The duel continued for several days and neither of them was willing to give up. After a long battle, Jarasandha grew tired. Krishna then hinted Bhima that when fatigued, a person might die if pressed too hard. Bhima understood Krishna's hint, lifted Jarasandha in the air and pressed his knee against Jarasandha's backbone, killing him instantly.

Jarasandha's son Sahadeva (not to be confused with the youngest Pandava) was placed on the throne of Magadha and he agreed to be a vassal to the Pandavas. He was killed in the Kurukshetra war by Shakuni along with his cousin, Jayadeva.

References

Citations

Sources

 Gibbs, Laura. Ph.D. Jarasandha Modern Languages MLLL-4993. Indian Epics.
Dowson, John (1820–1881). A classical dictionary of Hindu mythology and religion, geography, history, and literature. London: Trübner, 1879 [Reprint, London: Routledge, 1979]. 
Original Mahabharata by Shri Ved Vyasa
Gita press, Gorakhpur edition of Mahābhārata
Ramanand Sagar's "SHRI KRISHNA" serial
MRITYUNJAY-the story of Karna.

External links 

Characters in the Mahabharata
Salakapurusa